The Spanish language in South America varies within the different countries and regions of the continent. The term "South American Spanish" (Spanish: español sudamericano or español suramericano) is sometimes used as a broad name for the dialects of Spanish spoken on the continent, but such a term is only geographical and has little or no linguistic relevance. Spanish is the most widely spoken language of the South American continent, followed closely by Portuguese. 

The diverse Spanish dialects of the continent have no unifying feature to set them apart from non-South American varieties. The Spanish of the Andean highlands is historically conservative, having some traits in common with the Spanish of central Mexico, while varieties spoken in Argentina and Venezuela share some phonological innovations with the Spanish spoken on Caribbean islands. In some cases a single South American country—for example Colombia—presents a broad spectrum of conservative and innovative dialects.
Amazonic Spanish (Mainly in Eastern Peru also in nearby Ecuador, Southern Colombia and Southern Venezuela)
Andean Spanish  (Highlands of Bolivia, Ecuador, Chile and Peru; Highland of Colombia)
Caribbean Spanish (Venezuela, the Caribbean and Pacific coast of Colombia extending down to Ecuador; also spoken in the Caribbean islands of Cuba, Puerto Rico, and the Dominican Republic,)
Rioplatense Spanish (Argentina and Uruguay)
Argentine variations
Cuyo Spanish (Originally a branch of Chilean Spanish it has later on been influenced by Rioplatense) 
Bolivian Spanish
Chilean Spanish
Chilote Spanish
Colombian Spanish
Ecuadorian Spanish
Paraguayan Spanish
Peruvian Spanish
Peruvian Coast Spanish
Uruguayan Spanish
Venezuelan Spanish